The men's scratch at the 2006 Commonwealth Games took place on March 19, 2006 at the Vodafone Arena.

Qualification

Heat 1

Heat 2

Final

External links
 Qualification
 Final

Track cycling at the 2006 Commonwealth Games
Cycling at the Commonwealth Games – Men's scratch